
Evert Gummesson (born 1936) is Professor Emeritus of Service Marketing and Management at the Stockholm Business School, where he was formerly the Director of Research. He received his Ph.D. from Stockholm University, Stockholm School of Economics.  He is a Fellow and Honorary Doctor of Hanken School of Economics, Helsinki, Finland, and a Fellow of the University of Tampere, Finland.

Research 
Gummesson's research interest include services marketing, relationship marketing, service-dominant logic, organizational structure, grounded theory, case study methodology, and other research methodologies.

Professional Activities 
He is a Senior Advisory Board member for the European Journal of Marketing.

Publications 
 Gummesson, E. Montserrat, D-M. Saren, M. (2022). Improving the Evaluation of Scholarly Work. Springer Int Publ. AG.
 Gummesson, E. (2017). Case theory in business and management: Reinventing case study research. Sage.
 Gummesson, E. (2011). Total relationship marketing. Routledge.
 Lovelock, C., & Gummesson, E. (2004). Whither services marketing? In search of a new paradigm and fresh perspectives. Journal of service research, 7(1), 20-41.
 Gummesson, E. (2002). Relationsmarknadsföring i tjänsteföretag: från 4 P till 30 R. Liber.
 Gummesson, E. (2000). Qualitative methods in management research. Sage.
 Gummesson, E. (1984). Resultatinriktad marknadsföring. Norstedts Juridik.

Awards 
 S-D Logic Award (June 2011),

 Christopher Lovelock Career Contributions to the Service Discipline Award (2000),

References

External links 
 ResearchGate
 S-D Logic
 Kotler Impact

Living people
1936 births
Academic staff of the Stockholm School of Economics
Marketing theorists
Swedish marketing people